WWRB was a shortwave international broadcasting station known as both "World Wide Religious Broadcasting" and (to a lesser extent) "World Wide Radio Broadcasting" broadcasting from Morrison, Tennessee. It was a subsidiary of Airline Transport Communications Incorporated. The station featured primarily Christian religious programming.

WWRB quietly ceased shortwave broadcasting at the end of 2020 and continued operating solely as an Internet station. Owner David Frantz died January 2, 2022.

Transmitters
WWRB uses four 100 kW to 150 kW transmitters and six antennas to provide their services to regions of the world specifically requested by broadcasters. WWRB operated 24 hours a day, seven days a week, changing frequencies as shortwave propagation changes to maintain their target reception areas. Their main targeted services are titled Global-I through Global-IV.
 Global-I served Europe, Middle East, Africa
 Global-II served Australia and was leased part-time by Churches of Christ in 2011.
 Global-III served Europe, Middle East, Northern Africa, Canada, and Asia and was leased full-time by Overcomer Ministry
 Global-IV served Canada, and Asia and was leased full-time by Overcomer Ministry for a time. Was leased to a propagation study as of 2012.

Historical Frequencies
 Global-I: 2012: 3.215 and 3.195 MHz, 45° Dual feed Rhombic antenna
 Global-II: 2012: 5.050 MHz, 150° Dual feed wide spaced Yagi antenna
 Global-III: 2012: 9.285 and 3.185 MHz, 340° Dual feed rhombic antenna
 Global-IV: 2012: Leased for a shortwave propagation study

WWRB was last listed on the FCC frequency schedule in northern Summer, 2021: 5050 kHz from 2200-1300 UTC. In February 2023, the 5050 frequency was reallocated to WRMI, where it is used by Ted Randall (former engineer of 5085 WTWW) for his "WRMI Legends" oldies service.

References

Further reading
 
  (Callsign change from WGTG to WWFV to WWRB and move from McCaysville, Georgia to Manchester, Tennessee)
  - WGTG, predecessor to WWRB
 
 
  - Relocation of WGTG / WWFV in McCayesville, GA to WWRB in Manchester, TN

External links
 WWRB official site via Internet Archive
 WWRB - About page via Internet archive

Shortwave radio stations in the United States
WRB